Georgia has participated in the Turkvision Song Contest twice since its debut in . The Georgian broadcaster, Kvemio Kartlia Television (KKTV), was the broadcaster for the first contest, with Marneuli Television taking over in 2014. In 2013, Georgia's first entry at Turkvision, Eynar Balakişiyev and Afik Novruzov, failed to qualify for the grand final, as well as the 2014 entry, which actually came last at the semi final in Kazan, Tatarstan.

History
Georgia made their debut in the Turkvision Song Contest at the 2013 festival, in Eskişehir, Turkey. The Georgian broadcaster for the 2013 contest was Kumeo Kartlia Television (KKTV), the broadcaster held an open selection with a call for song on 14 October 2014. Eynar Balakişiyev and Afik Novruzov were selected to represent Georgia in Turkey, but they failed to qualify for the final.

In 2014 the contest was moved to a different broadcaster. Marneuli Television replaced the previous broadcaster Kvemio Kartlia Television, it was announced that auditions would be held in three cities in Georgia at the end of September, with a final in Marnueli, Georgia at the House of Culture on 5 October 2014. The winners of the national final were Aysel Mammadova & Ayla Şiriyeva.

Participation overview

See also 
 Georgia in the Eurovision Song Contest
 Georgia in the Junior Eurovision Song Contest

References 

Turkvision
Countries in the Turkvision Song Contest